Akçakent is a district of Kırşehir Province in the Central Anatolia region of Turkey. According to 2000 census, population of the district is 7,700 of which 1,268 live in the town of Akçakent.

Notes

References

External links

 District governor's official website 

Towns in Turkey
Populated places in Kırşehir Province
Districts of Kırşehir Province